Aabis Raza is a Pakistani television and film director. He is best known for his work in Urdu-television industry. Raza has been working as a TV director since 2011 and later he made his cinematic debut by directing 2018 rom-com Maan Jao Na.

Career 

Started his career as a director in 2002, some of his popular work that also received critical acclaim include Zard Mausam (2012) which was a tragic Cinderella story, Kankar (2013) which focuses on the subject of domestic abuse faced by women  and,  youth-based family drama Firaaq (2014). He later directed Nazo, focuses on the mental health and tells the story of a girl who is intellectually challenged. His recent directed serials Khudparast (2018-19) which deals with the underlying hypocrisy in our society and, supernatural horror Bandish (2019) were commercial as well as critical success.

Notable work

Film
 Maan Jao Na

Television series

References

External links 
 

Year of birth missing (living people)
Living people
Pakistani film directors
Pakistani television directors